Stargate (often stylized in all caps) is a military science fiction media franchise based on the film directed by Roland Emmerich, which he co-wrote with producer Dean Devlin. The franchise is based on the idea of an alien Einstein–Rosen bridge device (the Stargate) that enables nearly instantaneous travel across the cosmos. The franchise began with the film Stargate, released on October 28, 1994, by Metro-Goldwyn-Mayer and Carolco, which grossed US$197million worldwide. In 1997, Brad Wright and Jonathan Glassner created a television series titled Stargate SG-1 as a sequel to the film. This show was joined by Stargate Atlantis in 2004, Stargate Universe in 2009, and a prequel web series, Stargate Origins, in 2018. Also consistent with the same story are a variety of books, video games and comic books, as well as the direct-to-DVD movies Stargate: Children of the Gods, Stargate: The Ark of Truth, and Stargate: Continuum, which concluded the first television show after 10 seasons.

In 2011, Stargate Universe, the last Stargate program on television ended its run. Brad Wright announced that there were no more plans to continue the same story in further productions. In 2016, comic publisher American Mythology acquired the rights to publish new Stargate Atlantis stories set within the established franchise canon. This was expanded in 2017 to include new Stargate Universe comics as well, resolving the cliffhanger that ended the show. The predominant story arc thus ran for more than 15 years, including 18 seasons (364 episodes) of programming, and 22 comic book issues as of January 2020. However, a variety of other media either ignore this main continuity or reset it, while maintaining essential elements that define the franchise (mainly, the inclusion of a Stargate device). These include the 2002 animated series Stargate Infinity.

In 2017, the franchise was revived with the announcement of a new prequel web series, Stargate Origins. Episodes premiered on a central "fan hub" for the franchise called Stargate Command, with a season of ten 10-minute episodes.

In April 2022, all series in the franchise premiered on a dedicated channel on the streaming service Pluto TV.

Premise

Stargate productions center on the premise of a "Stargate", a ring-shaped portal that enables rapid transportation via wormhole to other stargates that are located cosmic distances away. The story begins when one such device is discovered on Earth. The 1994 film and subsequent television series depict how the device is kept under the control of the United States government, who use it to conduct interplanetary missions by dialing the thousands of stargates located in the galaxy, which are the legacy of an ancient civilization. The expeditions originally had the goal of acquiring extremely rare resources, new technology and detecting threats; but often face scientific and humanitarian issues and the dilemmas of interacting with different societies. Finally, they resulted in a unified United Nation-coalition to better support the constant need to continue the program to defend Earth from invading aliens.

Combined with the notion that the Stargate is a secret, Stargate productions are notable for presenting no contradiction with reality, being set in the present day on an otherwise normal Earth, and being dominated by human interaction in the galaxy. In the story of the 1994 film, this is explained as being the result of forced deportations by aliens, with the suggestion that most ancient mythologies are the result of aliens posing as gods in the distant past (as in unproven ancient astronauts).

The longest-running series, Stargate SG-1, presents the Milky Way galaxy as a failed state in which Goa'uld System Lords war against each other. Ra had been the Supreme System Lord and his death (which occurred in the film) undermined the existing social structure of the System Lords.  Humans have been deported throughout the galaxy from Earth by the Goa'uld, who used superior technology to pose as gods. These people are kept in poverty, ignorance, and slavery, and the Goa'uld also seem to believe the rulers' propaganda. The US Stargate Command is represented as having a higher level of civilization and a lower level of technology during conflicts, rarely preventing the Goa'uld from dominating planets.

Franchise releases
Due to multiple developers working separately and independently on the franchise over the years, the various Stargate productions are not entirely consistent with each other; and while no set of works forms an official canon, the largest following exists for the three live-action series. Through the work of various authors and developers, at least six separate story cycles can be discerned, some of which are continuations of the other ones (either endorsed or unendorsed by their predecessor).

Media releases

Films

Television

Documentaries and specials

Game releases

 Stargate: Timekeepers is a live strategy video game in development since May 2021 for the PC from Slitherine and CreativeForge Games.
 Stargate SG-1: Unleashed is an adventure game featuring the original SG-1 team for Android and iOS developed by MGM and Arkalis Interactive.
 Stargate: Resistance is an online, third-person shooter. It was released February 10, 2010. It has since been cancelled due to contracts with MGM. It is still downloadable, however.
 Stargate Worlds was a Stargate-universe massively multiplayer online role-playing game in development before its cancellation. The writers and producers of Stargate viewed Stargate Worlds as running side by side with the show in complete canon.
 Stargate SG-1: The Alliance was a computer game based on the Stargate universe, which was due to be released in late 2005, but was canceled.
 A Stargate Trading Card game was released in May 2007. It is available in both Online and Print forms. Designed by Sony Online Entertainmentwho also run the Online version of the gameand published by Comic Images.
 A Stargate Role-Playing Game (RPG) was produced by Alderac Entertainment. It was considered canon by both the publishers, and the staff of MGM. However, when Sony bought MGM, they lost the license to produce Stargate RPG products and the RPG license is unassigned.
 Two video games based on the film were published by Acclaim Entertainment: a 1995 eponymous side-scrolling platformer for the Super Nintendo Entertainment System (SNES) and Sega Genesis, and a Tetris-like puzzle game for the Sega Game Gear and Nintendo Game Boy.
 There are three simulator-style amusement park rides named Stargate SG-3000 located at Six Flags Kentucky Kingdom, Six Flags Great America, and Six Flags Marine World.
 A Stargate pinball game has been produced by Gottlieb.

Stargate franchise timeline

Theatrical films

Stargate

In 1994, the military science fiction feature film Stargate was released, directed by Roland Emmerich and co-written by Emmerich and Dean Devlin. The film lays the foundation for all the Stargate productions that come after it, by explaining the notion, function, and history of the Stargate.

The film begins with the unearthing of the Stargate in Giza in 1928. In a present day (1994) military base in Creek Mountain, Colorado, discredited Egyptologist Daniel Jackson (James Spader) enables use of the Stargate when he recognizes that symbols on the cover stones are asterisms in a three-dimensional coordinate system. A probe sent through the first Stargate connection revealed survivable conditions on the planet Abydos (which was believed to be billions of light-years away, in the Kaliam Galaxy on the far side of the known universe). A team led by Colonel Jack O'Neil (Kurt Russell) is then ordered to step through the Stargate and identify potential military threats on the other side. Jackson accompanies them to operate the other Stargate with his knowledge of the coordinate system.

The team discovers a slave civilization serving an alien who is posing as the Egyptian god Ra (Jaye Davidson). Ra and his minions have taken human form, dominating the slaves with brute force. With the help of the locals, O'Neil's team is eventually able to instigate a slave rebellion, overwhelming Ra's forces. Ra escapes in his mothership, but O'Neil is able to teleport a nuclear warhead on-board Ra's ship in orbit and detonate it. With Ra dead, the civilization can live in peace; O'Neil and his team return home through the Stargate, but Daniel Jackson stays on the planet with a young local woman named Sha'uri.

Other releases and possible future development 
In 1997, MGM Animation was reportedly in development on an animated direct-to-video entry in the franchise titled Stargate: The Young Explorers. However, the project never passed the development stage.

After Bill McCay had written a series of five novels continuing the story the original creators had envisioned, and despite the success of the Stargate television series, in 2006, Dean Devlin said: "He has struck a production deal with MGM and is developing the long-delayed sequel feature films that will pick up the story from the 1994 original." According to Devlin, two movie sequels would have picked up the story from the 1994 original, but not the mythology of the SG-1 and Atlantis series, with the original stars Kurt Russell and James Spader. Devlin regretted giving MGM control over the franchise. The first film already tapped into Egyptian mythology; the second one would have moved into other mythologies; and the third would have then tied all the mythologies together. Stargate SG-1 and Stargate Atlantis producer Brad Wright said in 2002 that "Devlin can wish to do a sequel to Stargate all he wants. MGM owns the rights, and I doubt very much that they'll ask him to do it. He knows better."

Plans for producing two sequels of the original film were announced by the original film's creator Dean Devlin at the 2006 San Diego Comic-Con. He was in talks with MGM to produce four films and he wanted two of them to be the final two films in his envisioned Stargate trilogy. In an interview with Sci Fi Wire, Devlin said that, should the sequels be made, he hoped to enlist Kurt Russell and James Spader. Both Russell and Spader expressed interest, Devlin revealed. "They've always said they wanted to do it. The irony is actually because it was 12 years ago that we made Stargate, [and] part two was actually supposed to take place about 12 years later. We were just going to kind of age them up as actors. So it actually works out really nicely." These sequels would bypass the 12 years of mythology created by SG-1 and Atlantis if they are ever produced.

On July 4, 2011, Dean Devlin spoke out again saying he had not given up on the idea of sequels to his 1994 feature film. He talked about the idea again in a new interview with Collider. Devlin actually wrote it as a trilogy of movies, but was never able to do parts two and three. His hope was, as the series started to wind down, that perhaps it would be time to actually get to do parts two and three:

It was announced that MGM and Warner Bros. are partnering with both Emmerich and Devlin for a reboot of Stargate as a trilogy with Emmerich directing and Devlin producing. However, Devlin told Empire Online in November 2016 that the plans to make a reboot of a potential new series were stalled.

At the Gatecon fan convention in September 2018, Stargate SG-1 producer Brad Wright announced that MGM had shown renewed interest in reviving the franchise, potentially on television rather than film. In subsequent years, Wright and others involved in the various television series teased a possible fourth series that would continue the SG-1 narrative. In November 2022, Wright announced that his revival project was likely dead following the sale of MGM to Amazon in March 2022. 

It was reported in December 2022 that Amazon Studios and MGM were planning to reboot the Stargate franchise.

Television

SG-1

In 1997, Jonathan Glassner and Brad Wright co-developed Stargate SG-1, a television series intended to continue the story laid down by the original film. Although new actors were cast, several roles from the film were reprised, including the main characters Daniel Jackson and Jack O'Neill (which was re-spelled to include an extra "L"). The Stargate Command setting was transferred from a fictional military facility located in Creek Mountain, to the Cheyenne Mountain Complex. Other variations and differences between the original film and SG-1 mostly concern the location of the planet Abydos, the alien Ra, the race of Ra's underlings (Jaffa), and Stargate travel.

The series debuted on Showtime on July 27, 1997, and moved to the Sci-Fi Channel after its fifth season. It starred Richard Dean Anderson (as O'Neill) and Michael Shanks (as Jackson), alongside Amanda Tapping, Christopher Judge and Don S. Davis respectively playing the new characters Samantha Carter, Teal'c and George Hammond. The cast remained fairly regular for most of SG-1s run, but experienced some changes. Michael Shanks left the show at the end of Season5 and was replaced by Corin Nemec as Jonas Quinn. Shanks returned at the beginning of Season7 and Nemec was written out. At the end of Season7 Davis left the show and Anderson filled the gap he left in the story. Season9 saw the departure of Anderson, but added new regulars Beau Bridges and Ben Browder. After a debut episode in Season 8, followed by appearances in eight episodes of Season 9, Claudia Black's popular reception earned her a position in the regular cast in Season 10.

MGM put an average of $1,400,000 into each episode of the show, and regarded it as one of its most important franchises. SG-1 was taken off air in 2007; however, two direct-to-DVD movies entitled The Ark of Truth and Stargate Continuum were made to tie up loose ends.

In June 2009, "Children of the Gods", Stargate SG-1's pilot episode, was re-cut into a Stargate SG-1 direct-to-DVD movie with brand new visual effects and scenes not previously included in the television version.

Atlantis

The Stargate Atlantis series follows the adventures of the "Atlantis expedition", a combination of military forces and civilian scientists who travel to the Pegasus Galaxy in search of the Lost City of Atlantis, left behind by the most powerful race known to ever have lived, referred to as the Ancients, also known as Lanteans and Alterans. The finding of the city had been a plot arc for most of SG-1'''s Season7, and the Ancients themselves had been a long-running facet of the SG-1 setting. Arriving at the city, the expedition discovers Atlantis rests at the bottom of an ocean, protected by shields keeping the city habitable. As the Atlantis expedition team explores the myriad corridors and equipment, they quickly drain the already nearly depleted power source (known as a ZPM) allowing the shields to hold and Atlantis to remain watertight. Through an emergency default program, Atlantis detects this sudden power drop and activates a failsafe, causing the city to surface and appear as an island in the middle of an ocean.

Using the Pegasus Galaxy stargate system, team members discover a new planet, where they explore, meet the indigenous population, and learn that the Pegasus galaxy is dominated by a terrible enemy known as the "Wraith". Although first encountered whilst in a long-term hibernation state, the expedition unintentionally and prematurely wakes the Wraith, alerting them to the reemergence of Atlantis, a new race of humans, and a potential new feeding ground: The Milky Way galaxy. Despite being vastly outnumbered, the team must defend and protect the city, the locals, and the entire expedition.Stargate Atlantis was a spin-off television series from Stargate SG-1. A new feature film was originally intended to transition the two series after the sixth season of SG-1. Later, SG-1 was renewed for a seventh season, and the feature film was then planned to transition that season. Finally, when SG-1 was renewed for an eighth season, the intended film instead became the two-part season finale episode "Lost City", and the setting of Stargate Atlantis was moved to the Pegasus galaxy. This allowed the two shows to exist side-by-side within the same fictional universe, and later the two shows even become interconnected. Atlantis was developed by most of the same people and in the same studios as SG-1.Atlantis debuted on the Sci-Fi Channel on July 16, 2004, starring Joe Flanigan and Torri Higginson in the lead roles, with Rainbow Sun Francks, David Hewlett, and Rachel Luttrell alongside. Hewlett and Higginson's characters had previously appeared in SG-1 (though Higginson inherited the role from actress Jessica Steen). In Atlantis second season, Paul McGillion and Jason Momoa (replacing Francks) were added as regulars. At the end of the third season, Higginson and McGillion were removed as regulars, both serving recurring roles in the 4th season. Season4 brought in Amanda Tapping, reprising her role as Samantha Carter from SG-1, and Jewel Staite in a recurring role. Tapping left the show for Season5 to concentrate on Sanctuary, and was replaced by Robert Picardo, who reprised his role as Richard Woolsey from both SG-1 and Atlantis. However, in late summer 2008 it was announced that SciFi would not renew Atlantis. The final episode aired on January 9, 2009.

UniverseStargate Universe is the third live-action Stargate series, and premiered on October 2, 2009. The series was pitched to the Sci Fi Channel in the fall of 2007, just before the writer's strikewhich put a hold on the project. "The pitch was received very well," according to Stargate Atlantis co-creator Brad Wright. Sci Fi Channel ordered Universe after announcing the cancellation of Stargate Atlantis. Syfy announced on December 16, 2010, that they would not pick the show up for a third season. The final episode aired May 9, 2011.

After the events of Stargate Atlantis, research into the Stargate's 9th and final chevron leads to an expedition being stranded several billion light years from earth on board an Ancient ship called Destiny which has been traveling through the universe unmanned for millions of years. The show follows the crew as they struggle to survive on board Destiny with no apparent way home. The show was intended to have a darker tone than its predecessors and delve more into the humanity of the characters and their relationships with each other.

The Ark of Truth, Continuum & Children of the GodsStargate: The Ark of Truth is a direct-to-DVD movie written and directed by Robert C. Cooper. The film is the conclusion of Stargate SG-1's Ori arc, and picks up after the SG-1 series finale, but takes place before the fourth season of Stargate Atlantis. The Ark of Truth was released as a Region1 DVD release on March 11, 2008. Sky One has broadcast the film on March 24, 2008, to be followed by the Region2 DVD release on April 28, 2008, with the Region4 DVD release on April 9, 2008.Stargate: Continuum is a direct-to-DVD movie written by Brad Wright and directed by Martin Wood. Some scenes for this movie were already shot at the end of March 2007, but the original start date was set for May 22 at Vancouver's Bridge Studios. The production budget was $7million. The movie was released on DVD and Blu-ray Disc on July 29, 2008. The Region4 DVD was released on August 6, 2008 with the Region2 DVD released on August 18, 2008; followed by possible TV broadcasts. The film is a time-travel adventure and is the second sequel to Stargate SG-1, after Stargate: The Ark of Truth.Stargate: Children of the Gods is a direct-to-DVD movie written by Jonathan Glassner and Brad Wright and directed by Mario Azzopardi.
The Stargate SG-1 pilot episode was re-cut as a third Stargate SG-1 direct-to-DVD special and released on July 21, 2009 by MGM Home Entertainment in 16:9 widescreen format. A few months before its release, executive producer Brad Wright announced it would be enhanced with brand new visual effects and scenes not previously included in the television version. The beginning was to be slightly altered, a new scene added, and the nudity scene taken out to make this episode suitable for children, with the final movie roughly seven minutes shorter than the original episode.

Post-Universe cancellation
In April 2009, MGM confirmed a third SG-1 film that Brad Wright had first announced in May 2008. Wright was set to co-write the film with former Stargate Atlantis executive producer Carl Binder, with Martin Wood serving as director. According to Wright, the film would center on the Jack O'Neill character and reunite as many of the SG-1 cast as possible, depending on the cost of the film and actor availability. Michael Shanks (Daniel Jackson) had confirmed his and Richard Dean Anderson's participation. Amanda Tapping confirmed her appearance in the third SG-1 film and the first Atlantis movie. According to Wright, the character of Vala Mal Doran would not appear in this film. The working title for the film, Stargate: Revolution was revealed by Joseph Mallozzi in his blog.

According to Sci-Fi and Joseph Mallozzi, a Stargate Atlantis two-hour direct-to-DVD movie was given the go ahead after the series was cancelled at the end of its fifth season. More movies were expected to follow in the Atlantis series if the first movie was successful. The rumored working title for the film was Stargate Extinction. By May 2009, the script for the film was finished.

On April 17, 2011, Stargate writer and executive producer Brad Wright announced that the SGU movie is not going to happen. He also confirmed that the proposed Stargate SG-1 and Atlantis movies have been permanently shelved, along with another movie idea he had been trying to get a greenlight on that would have involved cast members of all three series. Still, Wright did not rule out future Stargate films, saying; "It's a franchise. Stargate is not over. Somebody smart from MGM is going to figure it out, and something will happen."

In May 2014, MGM announced a re-imagined version of the original 1994 film to be produced as a trilogy with Warner Bros. Pictures. Emmerich will direct and Devlin will produce. This set of two sequel films to the original Stargate starring Kurt Russell and James Spader will take a dramatically different course than the SG-1 and Atlantis universe created in the following 15 years. On November 17, 2016, Devlin told Empire Online that the plans to make a reboot and potential new series are stalled.

Stargate Origins

In July 2017, a web series called Stargate Origins was announced at a San Diego Comic Con Panel celebrating the franchise's 20th anniversary. It focuses on the character of Catherine Langford and is a prequel both to the television continuity and to the original feature film. The shooting began in August 2017 and series premiered online at the Stargate Command website on February 15, 2018.

The cast includes Ellie Gall as the young Catherine Langford, Connor Trinneer as Catherine's father, Professor Paul Langford, Aylam Orian as Dr. Wilhelm Brücke, a high-ranking Nazi officer, Philip Alexander as Captain James Beal, British officer stationed in Egypt, and Shvan Aladdin as Wasif, a native Egyptian and a lieutenant in the British army.

InfinityStargate Infinity is an American animated science fiction television series created by Eric Lewald and Michael Maliani as a spin-off from its sister show, Stargate SG-1. The story arc in Infinity is set 30 years into the future and follows Gus Bonner and his team. Bonner's team was created after he was framed for a crime he did not commit. He escaped from Stargate Command (SGC) after the hostile alien race Tlak'kahn attacked the SGC to find the chrysalis. Together with his team he escapes through the Stargate with the chrysalis. From that point forward they go from planet to planet until they find the evidence to clear their names while learning about the unique cultures in the galaxy, so that they can one day return to Earth. The story arc was never resolved because of low viewership ratings and the show was cancelled in 2003.Stargate Infinity premiered in September 2002 as part of 4Kids Entertainment’s FOX BOX Saturday morning line-up on FOX and went off the air in June 2003. Due to its lack of popularity the show is almost completely unrecognized. The series was cancelled before any of its story arcs could be resolved. The show was of low budget, which was constantly noted by the media. DIC Entertainment released a 4-episode DVD on October 7, 2003 in Region1. MGM Home Entertainment released a five disc season box set on August 13, 2007 in Region2. Shout! Factory, a company known for releasing cult animated series, acquired the rights to the show and released the entire series to DVD on May 13, 2008 in Region1. , there is yet to come a release of Stargate Infinity package in Region4, namely Oceania and Latin America.

The writers and producers of Stargate SG-1, Stargate Atlantis and Stargate Universe and the main canon of the Stargate franchise were not involved with Infinity, and neither MGM, the production teams nor the fans of Stargate consider Infinity to be an official part of the Stargate universe. According to Stargate SG-1 co-creator Brad Wright, the animated series should not be considered official Stargate canon. Commenting on it, he stated, "I don't have a problem with it. I'm just not involved."

Possible fourth Stargate television series

In September 2018, it was reported that SG-1, Atlantis and Universe showrunner Brad Wright had been approached by MGM about continuing the franchise. The following year, SG-1 stars Amanda Tapping and Richard Dean Anderson further confirmed that they'd spoken to Wright and expressed their own interest in returning to the franchise in some capacity. In January 2019, Wright elaborated that his conversations with MGM pertained to continuing the television franchise in a way that fully acknowledged the "several hundred hours of show that's already out there" and not simply honouring it. In July 2020, SG-1, Atlantis and Universe writer-producer Joseph Mallozzi teased Wright's project, commenting that "we've never been closer to a fourth Stargate series." This continued in September 2020, when it was reported that whilst not currently involved in writing, Mallozzi had spoken to Wright about the development, confirming it to be a fourth television series which would continue on from where SG-1, Atlantis and Universe left off and include characters from those shows.

On November 21, 2020, Brad Wright confirmed that he was developing a television series of Stargate with MGM and that it would be a continuation, not a reboot. He also confirmed that whilst things were progressing, the industry shutdown during the coronavirus pandemic was slowing aspects of the development. In a series of podcasts in March and May 2021, Wright continued to offer small updates on the project, including that his script features the SG-1 characters of Daniel Jackson, Cameron Mitchell, Samantha Carter and Jack O'Neill, with the hope that Michael Shanks, Ben Browder and Amanda Tapping all return in some capacity to their respective roles. Wright also expressed that if the series does go ahead, he would want Tapping to direct, with it being clarified by Tapping that the series was not in active production, but still being worked on by Wright.

In March 2022, Amazon completed a purchase of MGM, its library, and assets, including Stargate. Around that time, writer and producer on Stargate SG-1, Atlantis, and Universe Joseph Mallozzi teased Wright's pilot script for the new project on social media. However, in November 2022, Wright announced that his revival project was likely dead following Amazon's purchase.

In December 2022, Amazon Studios and MGM were reported to be taking pitches on a reboot of the Stargate franchise. The creators of The Expanse, Mark Fergus and Hawk Ostby, were on the short list of possible showrunners for the new Stargate.

ReceptionStargate took in $16.7million on its opening weekend and $196.6million overall, and received mixed reactions from critics; while it was panned by some critics such as Roger Ebert, several positive reviews counterbalanced this leading to a score of 46% on Rotten Tomatoes. Although the film was originally intended as the first of a trilogy, Emmerich and Devlin ultimately moved on to produce Independence Day, and it was not until 2006 that Devlin showed renewed interest in developing sequels. In the intervening time, copyright-holder MGM succeeded the film with the television series Stargate SG-1 without the input of Emmerich and Devlin.Stargate SG-1 has won the Saturn Award for Best Syndicated Television Series on numerous occasions, and its cast has won similar awards for acting. More recently, it received acclaim for its visual effects, which increased in quality and realism as the show gained a larger budget. On August 21, 2006, the Sci Fi Channel announced that it would not be renewing Stargate SG-1 for an eleventh season after a series of poor performances in the Nielsen ratings. Many fans were enraged at the news, even creating websites in reaction to exhibit their commitment to the series. Spokesmen for the production have said all options for the continuation of SG-1 are being considered, including complete digital broadcasting. Executive producer Robert C. Cooper told the fansite GateWorld exclusively that he was working to continue SG-1. Currently, no network or company has ordered new episodes of SG-1, so the show is on hold until a new buyer can be found. However, SciFi has attempted to block other networks from taking up the show, citing its original exclusive contract with MGM. Atlantis proved to be as successful as SG-1, with Nielsen ratings and viewership. The Stargate franchise in 2009 won a Constellation Award in the category of Outstanding Canadian Contribution to Science Fiction Film or Television in 2008.

The average viewership to Stargate SG-1 and Atlantis was around ten million a week worldwide. According to Stargate SG-1 and Atlantis co-creator Brad Wright, the show is popular in Great Britain, Germany, France and Australia, but with a steadily declining viewership in homeland Canada. About thirty million Stargate DVDs were sold worldwide by 2006.

The DVD release of Stargate: The Ark of Truth in the US earned MGM/Fox $1.59million in rentals in the first week after the release, and another $1.38million in rentals in the second week. In its third week it earned US$1.19million in rentals totaling $4.16million. The DVD has also earned $9million in sales. Stargate: Continuum would go on to gross over $8million United States dollars in the United States. The film sparked mostly positive reviews with movie critics. A third Stargate SG-1 movie was planned to follow Continuum, but the third movie was put on hold with any other future Stargate movies; the film would have centered around the character of Jack O'Neill.

In 2010 Stargate was estimated to have injected $1 billion in to the economy of British Columbia.

Lawsuit
In 1996, Omar Zuhdi, a Shawnee high school teacher, was able to get a court date to proceed in a trial against the makers and originators of the original movie, claiming they had stolen the plot and story of his 1984 script Egyptscape, as the basis of the film Stargate. A judge granted a motion by both parties to have the case dismissed.

Literature

There are three series of novels based on the Stargate franchise, one based on the original Stargate film and two based in the Stargate SG-1 and Stargate Atlantis television shows. A series of books written by Bill McCay, published from 1995 to 1999, were unofficial sequels to the film. These were produced by consulting the original notes made by Dean Devlin and Roland Emmerich, in an attempt to envision where the film "would have gone". Neither party has commented on whether McCay's interpretation was correct. Despite attempting to remain close to the original vision, the subsequent television series Stargate SG-1 (which began under an entirely independent development) developed the story along different lines, making no attempt to reconcile the plot lines of the books. This marked the first major branching of the franchise.

From 1999 to 2001, ROC published four novels based in Stargate SG-1 written by Ashley McConnell. In 2004, UK-based Fandemonium Press started a new series of licensed tie-in novels based on Stargate SG-1. Due to the conflict with ROC's license, these books were available in Australia, Canada, New Zealand, South Africa and the UK, but not in the US. Fandemonium books became available in the US in 2006. The official Stargate Magazine, produced by Titan Publishing, began publishing short stories written by Fandemonium authors in their 8th issue. The stories alternate between SG-1 and Atlantis.

A series of comic books, based on Stargate SG-1 and Stargate Atlantis, began to be published by Avatar Press in 2003. Five have been published to date, with stories by James Anthony and artwork by Jorge Correa. In February 2008, it was announced that Big Finish Productions would release officially licensed audiobooks featuring members of the cast reading new stories. The first two stories, available on CD and digital download, are Gift of the Gods read by Michael Shanks and A Necessary Evil'' read by Torri Higginson.

References

External links

 
 
  at Sci Fi Channel
 Stargate Talking Books Official Site
 Stargate Wiki

 
Mass media franchises introduced in 1994
Ancient Egypt in fiction
Language in fiction
Mass media franchises
Television franchises
Fiction about wormholes
Fiction about intergalactic travel
Metro-Goldwyn-Mayer franchises